Alvin W. Vanderbush (September 16, 1907 – February 20, 2005) was an American football coach and college athletics administrator. He served as the head football coach at Hope College in Hope, Michigan from 1946 to 1954, compiling a record of 50–33–2.

Head coaching record

References

External links
 

1907 births
2005 deaths
Hope Flying Dutchmen athletic directors
Hope Flying Dutchmen football coaches
Hope College alumni
Hope Flying Dutchmen football players